The Petřín funicular is a funicular railway in the Czech capital city of Prague. It links the Malá Strana district with the top of Petřín hill. The funicular is operated by the tramway division of Prague Integrated Transport, the local public transit system.

History

The cable car ran all year round, in the winter months and in the mid-1890s only on weekends, because of water freezing up the tracks.

This original line closed with start of the First World War in 1914 and did not reopen after the end of hostilities. The construction of a new funicular, in which only Prague workers participated, began on 4 November 1931. Both of the original railway stations were demolished, with the rails and the wagons dismantled. Two new cars built by Ringhoffer, were put on the track between 3 and 10 May 1932. At the turn of May and June, test drives were carried out, followed by a successful technical-police test, and on 5 June 1932, regular operation began. The intermediate stop Nebozízek was put into operation approximately one month later, on July 9.

The line operated throughout the Second World War, with the exception of two short closures. The operation of the funicular was temporarily stopped both in the autumn of 1938 (for about one month) and at the end of the war in 1945 (for about four months). After the war, repairs of the track, buildings and replacement of the tow rope took place mostly before the Spartakiads, when an increase in passenger numbers was expected to rise.

However, a landslide in 1965 caused the service to be suspended, and it was not resumed until 1985. At that time new cars were provided and the track was reconstructed, but the original machinery retained. Both new cars were imported to Prague on 7 February 1985 and re-railed onto the track the next day. On April 17, tests began, and on 9 May 1985, a test operation without passengers began. The ceremonial opening of regular operation took place on 15 June 1985. On 19 July of the same year, the intermediate stop Nebozízek was put into operation.

Operation

The funicular has three stops: Újezd (at the bottom of the hill), Nebozízek (the middle station) and Petřín (at the top of the hill). The funicular operates daily from 9 am to 11:30 pm, with the interval being between 15 and 20 minutes. Special Fare is applied - funicular ride is included in 24 and 72 hrs and seasonal tickets, other short-term tickets are not valid here, in such case you have to buy special ticket valid for single ride only.

Trivia

According to Czech legend, the name of the middle station Nebozízek stems from an incident in which little son of Emperor Charles IV, requesting food, was unable to properly pronounce the Czech letter "ř" when he asked for a schnitzel, so instead of "nebo řízek" (meaning, "or schnitzel"), he expressed the word Nebozízek which actually means little gimlet.

See also 
 List of funicular railways

References

Bibliography

External links 

Page on the Petřín funicular from DP Praha's official web site
Article on the Petřín funicular from Funimag

Funicular railways in the Czech Republic
Rail transport in Prague
Former water-powered funicular railways converted to electricity
Metre gauge railways in the Czech Republic
Transport infrastructure completed in 1891
Petřín